Scopula falcataria is a moth of the family Geometridae. It was described by Warren in 1901. It is endemic to Peru.

References

Moths described in 1901
Moths of South America
falcataria
Taxa named by William Warren (entomologist)